Blackhall Rocks is a village on the North Sea coast of County Durham, North East England. It is situated on the A1086 between Horden and Hartlepool, and just south of Blackhall Colliery which it adjoins. It is sometimes referred to by locals in the area as "The Rocks".

One of the earliest mentions of Blackhall Rocks is in the mid-19th century, when the beach was photographed. This was a time when the beach was part of a minor holiday resort, due to the location of a hotel above the cliffs. It was around this time a railway station was established here, which was closed in 1960. Adjacent to the station a siding and coal depot supplied coal from Blackhall Colliery 1 mile north to the surrounding area. The hotel remained up until the late 1960s when it was demolished, at a time when it had been used as flats, as a form of temporary housing, by Easington (district) Council, since the 1940s.

Despite the presence of the hotel, it was not until the 1920s and 1930s that Blackhall Rocks really developed as a community and village, something which is itself evident driving down the "coast road" (the A1086). Most of the houses along this road were built for middle class commuters, hence the proliferation of semi-detached houses and bungalows. In the late 1930s the local council built a large council estate to the west of the coast road, around the road to High Hesleden. Later on in the 1960s and 1970s a series of new council homes were built to the east, between the coast road and the railway line.

References

The Battlefield Band composed a song entitled "Blackhall Rocks". It was named after this village.

External links

Villages in County Durham
Populated coastal places in County Durham
Nature reserves of the Durham Wildlife Trust